Lonardo is a surname. Notable people with the surname include:

 Alessandrina Lonardo (born 1953), Italian politician
 Angelo Lonardo (1911−2006), American mobster 
 Joseph Lonardo (1884–1927), American mobster
 Roberto Lonardo (born 1943), Uruguayan footballer

See also
 Lonardi, surname

Italian-language surnames